Ictericodes cashmerensis is a species of tephritid or fruit flies in the genus Ictericodes of the family Tephritidae.

Distribution
India.

References

Tephritinae
Insects described in 1927
Diptera of Asia